Surgana State was a princely state of the Bombay Presidency during the era of the British Raj. It was the only state belonging to the Nasik Agency. Its capital was Surgana in Nashik District of present-day Maharashtra. It was ruled by Kolis of Pawar dynasty.
 
Surgana State's last ruler signed the instrument of accession to join India in March 1948.

History 
Surgana State was founded before the 1800s. Surgana State became a British protectorate in 1818. The British made Bhikaji Rao as the new chief as he helped them against the Marathas. Bhikaji Rao was murdered in the riot caused by the mother of Malharrao and her brother-in-law, Pilaji. Pilaji was captured and executed by the British. The descendants of Malharrao were allowed the share in revenues of the state in 1846 and were granted an allowance grant in 1877. The chief of the state had powers to elect a Representative Member of the Chambers of Princes from 1921 to 1947. In March 1948, the last chief Dhairyashil Rao signed the Gujarat States Merger Agreement and ceded the state to India.

Later Dhairyashil Rao also served as the Member of the Rajya Sabha in 1952–1968 and 1972–1978.

The Princely State was bordered on the south by Peinth in Nasik, and in the west by the Bansda and Dharampur States.

Rulers
The rulers of the state bore the title deshmukh. Surgana State's rulers were said to belong to the Mahadev Kolis.

Deshmukhs
bf.1800 – 1818             .....
1818 – 1819 Malhar Rao                         (d. 1819) 
1819 – 1820 Bhikaji Rao 
1820 – 1854 Jashwant Rao I Bhikaji Rao 
1854 – 1867 Muvar Rao 
1867 –  2 June 1898 Shankar Rao Ravi Rao               (b. 1849 – d. ....) 
1898 – 22 June 1930 Pratap Rao Shankar Rao             (b. 18 August 1880 – d. 1930) 
1930 – 1936 Jashwant Rao II Pratap Rao         (b. 1902 – d. ....)
April 1936 – 15 August 1947 Dhairyashil Rao Jashwant Rao     (b. 1922 – 2003)

See also
List of Koli states and clans
Political integration of India

References

Nashik district
Princely states of Maharashtra
Rajputs
Koli princely states